Mannan 1,4-mannobiosidase (1,4-beta-D-mannan mannobiohydrolase, exo-beta-mannanase, exo-1,4-beta-mannobiohydrolase) is an enzyme with systematic name 4-beta-D-mannan mannobiohydrolase. This enzyme catalyses the following chemical reaction

 Hydrolysis of (1->4)-beta-D-mannosidic linkages in (1->4)-beta-D-mannans, to remove successive mannobiose residues from the non-reducing chain ends

References

External links 
 

EC 3.2.1